The Stolniceni is a left tributary of the river Siret in Romania. It flows into the Siret in Gura Bâdiliței.

References

Rivers of Romania
Rivers of Iași County